Gufool is a neighborhood of the city of Manama, in Bahrain. The area is most famous for having a water garden.

References

Neighborhoods of Manama